List of rivers in Rio de Janeiro (Brazilian State).

The list is arranged by drainage basin from north to south, with respective tributaries indented under each larger stream's name and ordered from downstream to upstream. All rivers in Rio de Janeiro drain to the Atlantic Ocean.

By Drainage Basin 

 Itabapoana River
 Guaxindiba River
 Paraíba do Sul
 Muriaé River
 São Domingos River
 Carangola River
 Conceição River
 Do Colégio River
 Dois Rios River
 Negro River
 Grande River
 Bengala River
 Pomba River
 Pirapetinga River
 Paquequer River
 São Francisco River
 Calçado River
 Paraibuna River
 Preto River
 Das Flores River
 Bonito River
 São Fernando River
 Piabanha River
 Fagundes River
 Preto River
 Paquequer River
 Das Bengalas River
 Dos Frades River
 Alegre River
 Piraí River
 Cachimbau River
 Barra Mansa River
 Bananal River
 Bocaina River
 Turvo River
 Barreiro de Baixo River
 Pirapetinga River
 Sesmarias River
 Campo Belo River
 Do Salto River
 Pitangueiras River
 Ururaí River
 Preto River
 Bela Joana River
 Do Imbé River
 Mocotó River
 Urubu River
 Macabu River
 Do Meio River
 Macabuzinho River
 Santa Catarina River
 Carucango River
 Campista River
 Macaé River
 São Pedro River
 Sana River
 Bonito River
 Das Flores River
 Imboacica River
 São João River
 Indaiaçu River
 Aldeia Velha River
 Capivari River
 Bacaxá River
 Una River
 Mataruna River
 Regame River
 Ubatiba River
 Guaxindiba River
 Alcântara River
 Maria Paula River
 Pendotiba River
 Caceribu River
 Porto das Caixas River
 Da Aldeia River
 Do Gado River
 Dos Duques River
 Bonito River
 Macacu River
 Soberbo River
 Guapi-Áçu River
 Magé River
 Iriri River
 Suruí River
 Estrela River
 Inhomirim River
 Saracuruna River
 Imbariê River
 Iguaçu River
 Sarapuí River
 Capivari River
 Botas River
 Tinguá River
 São João de Meriti River (Meriti River)
 Acari River
 Pavuna River
 Jequiá River (on Governador Island)
 Faria Timbó River
 Maracanã River
 Trapicheiros River
 Carioca River
 Grande River
 Piraquê River
 Cabuçu River
 Guandu River
 Piranema River
 Guandu-Mirim River
 Queimados River
 Dos Poços River
 Santo Antônio River
 São Pedro River
 Santana River
 Ribeirão das Lajes
 Da Guarda River (Itaguaí River)
 Mazomba River
 Do Saco River
 Japuiba River
 Bracuí River
 Mambucaba River
 Do Funil River
 Da Barra Grande River
 Perequê-Áçu River
 Dos Meros River
 Pará Mirim River

Alphabetically 

 Acari River
 Alcântara River
 Da Aldeia River
 Aldeia Velha River
 Alegre River
 Bacaxá River
 Bananal River
 Da Barra Grande River
 Barra Mansa River
 Barreiro de Baixo River
 Bela Joana River
 Bengala River
 Das Bengalas River
 Bocaina River
 Bonito River
 Bonito River
 Bonito River
 Botas River
 Bracuí River
 Cabuçu River
 Caceribu River
 Cachimbau River
 Calçado River
 Campista River
 Campo Belo River
 Capivari River
 Capivari River
 Carangola River
 Carioca River
 Carucango River
 Do Colégio River
 Conceição River
 Dois Rios River
 Dos Duques River
 Estrela River
 Fagundes River
 Faria Timbó River
 Das Flores River
 Das Flores River
 Dos Frades River
 Do Funil River
 Do Gado River
 Grande River
 Grande River
 Guandu River
 Guandu-Mirim River
 Guapi-Áçu River
 Da Guarda River (Itaguaí River)
 Guaxindiba River
 Guaxindiba River
 Iguaçu River
 Imbariê River
 Do Imbé River
 Imboacica River
 Indaiaçu River
 Inhomirim River
 Iriri River
 Itabapoana River
 Japuiba River
 Jequiá River (on Governador Island)
 Macabu River
 Macabuzinho River
 Macacu River
 Macaé River
 Magé River
 Mambucaba River
 Maracanã River
 Maria Paula River
 Mataruna River
 Mazomba River
 Do Meio River
 Dos Meros River
 Mocotó River
 Muriaé River
 Negro River
 Paquequer River
 Paquequer River
 Pará Mirim River
 Paraíba do Sul
 Paraibuna River
 Pavuna River
 Pendotiba River
 Perequê-Áçu River
 Piabanha River
 Piraí River
 Piranema River
 Pirapetinga River
 Pirapetinga River
 Piraquê River
 Pitangueiras River
 Dos Poços River
 Pomba River
 Porto das Caixas River
 Preto River
 Preto River
 Preto River
 Queimados River
 Regame River
 Ribeirão das Lajes
 Do Saco River
 Do Salto River
 Sana River
 Santa Catarina River
 Santana River
 Santo Antônio River
 São Domingos River
 São Fernando River
 São Francisco River
 São João de Meriti River (Meriti River)
 São João River
 São Pedro River
 São Pedro River
 Saracuruna River
 Sarapuí River
 Sesmarias River
 Soberbo River
 Suruí River
 Tinguá River
 Trapicheiros River
 Turvo River
 Ubatiba River
 Una River
 Urubu River
 Ururaí River

References
 Map from Ministry of Transport
  GEOnet Names Server

 
Rio de Jan
Rio de Janeiro (state)-related lists
Environment of Rio de Janeiro (state)